Muskegon River is a river in the western portion of the lower peninsula of the U.S. state of Michigan. The river source is located at Houghton Lake in Roscommon County, flowing out of the North Bay into neighboring Missaukee County. The river passes through Clare County, Osceola County, Mecosta County, Newaygo County, and Muskegon County, and generally flows southwesterly to its mouth at Muskegon, Michigan, where it empties into Muskegon Lake. Muskegon Lake is connected to Lake Michigan via a mile-long channel. The river has several major branches, such as the Hersey River, Cedar Creek and Little Muskegon River.
In September 2002, an article in National Geographic raised concerns about a controversial deal made with Nestlé Waters North America, giving them permission "to bottle up to 210 million gallons (about 800 million liters) a year from an aquifer north of Grand Rapids, Michigan that recharges the Muskegon River".

Description of the watershed 
The Muskegon River watershed drains 2,350 square miles (6,100 km2) from ten counties in north central Michigan: Muskegon, Newaygo, Mecosta, Clare, Osceola, and Roscommon.  The watershed flows through the cities of  Muskegon, Newaygo, Big Rapids, Evart, and Houghton Lake.  The river follows a southwesterly route through north central Michigan from its headwaters at Houghton Lake to its mouth at Muskegon Lake, which ultimately empties into Lake Michigan.

There are three man-made reservoirs on the Muskegon River, the Rogers Dam Pond, Hardy Dam Pond, and the Croton Dam Pond.  All three dams on the river are owned and operated by Consumers Power for power generation purposes.  Rogers Dam is located in Mecosta County south of Big Rapids, with Hardy Dam and Croton Dam located in Newaygo County.

History
Like many of its neighboring streams, the Muskegon was one of the favored logging rivers during the boom years of the 1880s-1890s, and a keen eye can still pick out remnants of stray logs embedded on the river bottom, left over from the spring logging runs. The river has a unique Native American heritage to it for fishing and hunting

Winfield Scott Gerrish is credited with revolutionizing the Michigan lumber industry by building a seven-mile-long logging railroad from Lake George to the Muskegon River. However, there were several Michigan logging railroads in operation in the 1850s, including the seven-mile-long Blendon Lumber Company railroad in Ottawa County, which was the first in the state to employ a steam locomotive in May 1857.

Wildlife
There is abundant wildlife, including otters, waterfowl, white-tailed deer, and eagles and, although development has been creeping in, the upper reaches are still fairly remote and natural with much of the surrounding land composed of state-owned tracts.

The Muskegon State Game Area is an 8,411 acre section of land which overlays the Muskegon River on the section between Maple Island Road and US Route 31.  This state game area is accessible for licensed hunters.  Permits can be obtained for whitetail deer hunting and waterfowl hunting.  The Muskegon State Game Area spans both Muskegon County and Newaygo County.

Recreation
In recent years, the river has gained a certain measure of fame as a recreational fishery, boasting large migratory steelhead, brown trout and planted Chinook Salmon.
People have also taken a liking to paddling down the river. It is Michigan's second largest river only to the Grand River. It is surprisingly quite slow, making it perfect for beginners learning in either a kayak or canoe.
Being such a peaceful river, it promises ample opportunities for viewing wildlife. This factor attracts tourists from across the state and the world.  
Camping is another popular activity around the river, with several shoreline parks and campgrounds. Various inns and cabins down the river can provide  accommodations for up to a month.
Hunting is popular in the forests near by on public hunting land.

Crossings 

There are approximately 31 bridge crossings over the Muskegon River waterway.  These bridge crossing include motorized vehicle crossings, railroads, and several pedestrian/bicycle trail crossings.  The majority of the bicycle and pedestrian trail crossings are former railroad bridges which have been converted to non-motorized traffic.

Dams
The three major dams of the Muskegon River (Rogers, Hardy and Croton) generate about 45,600 kilowatts, with about 30,000 of that from Hardy Dam.  This provides enough electricity to serve a community of nearly 23,000.  The smaller Reedsburg Dam is near the source of the Muskegon River.

Cities and towns along the river 

 Houghton Lake, Michigan
 Leota, Michigan
 Evart, Michigan
 Hersey, Michigan
 Big Rapids, Michigan
 Newaygo, Michigan
 Muskegon, Michigan

See also 

 Houghton Lake
 Lake Michigan
 List of rivers in Michigan

References

Rivers of Michigan
Rivers of Muskegon County, Michigan
Rivers of Newaygo County, Michigan
Rivers of Mecosta County, Michigan
Rivers of Osceola County, Michigan
Rivers of Clare County, Michigan
Rivers of Missaukee County, Michigan
Rivers of Roscommon County, Michigan
Tributaries of Lake Michigan